The Direct Registration System (DRS) or direct holding system is a traditional system of securities clearance, settlement and ownership in which owners of securities have a direct relationship with the issuer. As implemented in the past, investors would either be recorded on the issuer's register or they would be in physical possession of bearer securities certificates.

Advantages
Directly registering a stock precludes it from being borrowed by  short sellers. Additionally, it acts as an artificial source of 'illiquidity' for investors who wish to precommit to a long term position, as shares held in a DHS take longer to sell, and are often batched at market prices (ie sellers have little control over their exit price). This of course is also a disadvantage for many investors, who prefer the convenience and liquidity of a traditional broker.

Historic disadvantages
Within this system, transfers of securities had to be settled through the physical delivery of paper certificates and instruments of transfer. As a result, transactions were expensive in terms of labor and time. They were also risky, especially when transferred over long distances, since paper documents could be lost, stolen or counterfeited. Furthermore, while in transit, securities were not available for use or investment, causing what has been called "pipeline liquidity risk". These disadvantages have now been eliminated by the more modern and secure method of the electronic Direct Registration System (DRS) operated by stock transfer agents.

Indirect holding system
Because of these disadvantages, the "direct holding system" was replaced by the indirect holding system. Settlement by physical delivery of certificates worked adequately until the 1960s, when a sharp increase in trading volumes overwhelmed the system. The amount of paper that physically had to be moved around led to the famous "paperwork crisis" on Wall Street in the late 1960s. This provided the impetus for the introduction of the indirect or multi-tiered holding system.

Although the indirect or multi-tiered holding system has increased settlement speed, thus reducing the risk that the counter-party in the relevant transaction will fail before the transaction is settled, it effectively cuts off the issuer of shares from the shareholders.  This is because either a central securities depository or a financial institution becomes the recorded shareholder on the books of the company and the real, or beneficial shareholder is known only to the financial institution holding the account. The result has been to drastically complicate communication between shareholders and their companies, and increase the cost of such communication.

Recent interest in DRS
Some internet communities, particularly subreddits involved in the GameStop short squeeze and subsequent wave of "meme investing", have advocated for the use of direct registration as a response to alleged fraudulent activity by brokers and hedge funds. After the short squeeze in 2021, many 'meme' investors suspected price manipulation designed to protect the interests of financial institutions. In particular, they believed that the price had been suppressed through the use so-called "naked shorts"; essentially, it was alleged that more short positions had been opened than should have been possible. Thus began a movement to directly register as many shares of Gamestop (GME) as possible. Directly registered shares cannot be borrowed by shortsellers. If the entire "free float" of GME shares was placed into a Direct Holding System, it should become theoretically impossible to short the stock. Additionally, shortsellers trying to close their positions would be unable to find available shares with which to do so, supposedly exposing the extent of illegal shorting and price manipulation in the market. This event has been dubbed "MOASS" (Mother of All Short Squeezes) by believers. As of November 2022 approximately 72 Million shares had been registered, or DRS'd through the stock transfer agent, ComputerShare.  There are approximately 156 million shares in the 'free float'; Outstanding shares - (insider shares + shares held by institutions, ETFs, and Mutual Funds). There are approximately 305 million total shares.

Electronic system in the US
In the 1990s, the U.S. Securities and Exchange Commission (SEC) working with the securities industry, developed a new form of, "direct holding system" that would allow both the speedy settlement of securities transactions and communication between shareholders and their companies.  This new system was a type of book-entry direct registration system (DRS) operated by a stock transfer agent. This concept would allow any retail investor who wants his or her securities to be registered directly on the books of the issuer, but does not necessarily want to receive a certificate, to register those securities in book-entry form directly on the books of the issuer.  DRS is not widely adopted by retail investors. Most retail stock ownership is accomplished through a broker, which is the registered shareholder in the eyes of the issuer. The use of DRS allows individual investors the status of direct shareholders of the issuer (rather than simply customers of a broker).  Despite recent calls for the normalization of direct registration, a modern and efficient DRS form of direct holding remains for out of reach for many investors.

Legal ramifications
In a system that used paper certificates for securities, the doctrine of lex loci rei sitae (the law of the place of location of the securities) was applied to determine the validity of certain rights in or transfers of securities. In the case of bearer securities, this is taken to be the law of the jurisdiction where the certificates actually are (e.g., in a pledge, where the recipient of the collateral takes possession of the securities certificate at the time of transfer). In the case of registered securities, the lex loci rei sitae is either the law of the issuer's jurisdiction or the law of the jurisdiction where the securities records of the issuer or its official recordholder are located at the time of transfer.  In a system in which securities are mostly held indirectly through brokers and banks (as discussed above) or in which securities are evidenced mainly on accounts (referred to as "dematerialization") rather than by certificates, an alternative rule of "the law of the relevant intermediary" has come to be used.  According to this rule, the law chosen in the account agreement with the financial institution that holds the account in which the securities are evidenced or the place where the office of the intermediary with which the account holder normally deals is the law used. This is the technique used in the Hague Convention on The Law Applicable to Certain Rights in Respect of Securities Held with an Intermediary, and also used in the Article 8, "Investment Securities" of the United States Uniform Commercial Code.  The advantages of this rule for international financial transactions is that wherever securities are located or regardless of how many offices and branches a financial institution has, persons dealing in the securities can know the law that will govern a transaction such as a sale, a pledge or a loan of securities.

See also
Dematerialization (securities)
Book entry
Stock certificate

References

Securities (finance)